Marko Asell (born 8 May 1970 in Ylöjärvi) is a Finnish wrestler and Olympic medalist in Greco-Roman wrestling. He was also a politician and member of Finnish Parliament in 2007–2011.

Olympics
Asell competed at the 1996 Summer Olympics in Atlanta where he received a silver medal in Greco-Roman wrestling, the welterweight class. He also competed at the 2000 Summer Olympics.

References

External links

1970 births
Living people
People from Ylöjärvi
Social Democratic Party of Finland politicians
Members of the Parliament of Finland (2007–11)
Members of the Parliament of Finland (2019–23)
Olympic wrestlers of Finland
Wrestlers at the 1996 Summer Olympics
Wrestlers at the 2000 Summer Olympics
Finnish male sport wrestlers
Olympic silver medalists for Finland
Olympic medalists in wrestling
Medalists at the 1996 Summer Olympics